The City of Evans is a home rule municipality located in Weld County, Colorado, United States. The city population was 22,165 at the 2020 United States Census, a 19.57% increase since the 2010 United States Census. Evans is a part of the Greeley, CO Metropolitan Statistical Area and the Front Range Urban Corridor.

History
Named for the second Territorial Governor of Colorado, John Evans, the town was established in 1867 and was Weld County's seat of government twice before Greeley finally captured the honor.  Legend in Evans is that the county records were stolen by night-riders from Greeley, who also burned the courthouse down with the county seat documents. The town was incorporated in 1885.

Today, Evans, like other towns in Colorado along the South Platte River, is home to a rapidly growing Hispanic population.  Evans has several primary commercial areas located along US 85 just south of its junction with US 34, as well along 23rd Avenue and on 37th Street with new commercial areas developing as the city expands to the west and south of the South Platte River.

Geography
Evans is located at  (40.379310, −104.710450).

At the 2020 United States Census, the town had a total area of  including  of water.

Demographics

As of the census of 2000, there were 9,514 people, 3,277 households, and 2,359 families living in the city. The racial makeup of the city was 71.08% White, 0.79% African American, 1.28% Native American, 0.71% Asian, 0.02% Pacific Islander, 22.45% from other races, and 3.66% from two or more races. Hispanic or Latino of any race were 40.08% of the population.

There were 3,277 households, out of which 43.8% had children under the age of 18 living with them, 51.3% were married couples living together, 14.3% had a female householder with no husband present, and 28.0% were non-families. 19.3% of all households were made up of individuals, and 6.0% had someone living alone who was 65 years of age or older.  The average household size was 2.90 and the average family size was 3.33.

In the city, the population was spread out, with 32.1% under the age of 18, 14.2% from 18 to 24, 32.3% from 25 to 44, 15.2% from 45 to 64, and 6.2% who were 65 years of age or older.  The median age was 27 years. For every 100 females, there were 98.2 males.  For every 100 females age 18 and over, there were 93.9 males.

The median income for a household in the city was $37,158, and the median income for a family was $42,983. Males had a median income of $30,938 versus $22,946 for females. The per capita income for the city was $15,329.  About 9.8% of families and 14.9% of the population were below the poverty line, including 19.6% of those under age 18 and 6.4% of those age 65 or over.

Education
Evans is within Weld County School District Six.  zoned elementary schools serving sections of Evans include Centennial, Dos Rios, and Heiman in Evans and Bella Romero Elementary School in an unincorporated section of Weld County. Middle school-aged students are zoned to Brentwood Middle School in Greeley, while high school students are zoned to Greeley West High School in Greeley.

See also

Colorado
Bibliography of Colorado
Index of Colorado-related articles
Outline of Colorado
List of counties in Colorado
List of municipalities in Colorado
List of places in Colorado
List of statistical areas in Colorado
Front Range Urban Corridor
North Central Colorado Urban Area
Denver-Aurora, CO Combined Statistical Area
Greeley, CO Metropolitan Statistical Area

References

External links

City of Evans website
CDOT map of the City of Evans

Cities in Weld County, Colorado
Cities in Colorado
Populated places established in 1867
1867 establishments in Colorado Territory